The Communauté d'agglomération de Vesoul is a communauté d'agglomération, an intercommunal structure, in the Haute-Saône department, in the Bourgogne-Franche-Comté region, eastern France. It was created in January 2012 from the former communautés de communes de l'agglomération de Vesoul. Its seat is Vesoul. Its area is 145.5 km2. Its population was 32,203 in 2018, of which 14,973 in Vesoul proper.

Composition
The communauté d'agglomération consists of the following 20 communes:

Andelarre
Andelarrot
Chariez
Charmoille
Colombier
Comberjon
Coulevon
Échenoz-la-Méline
Frotey-lès-Vesoul
Montcey
Montigny-lès-Vesoul
Mont-le-Vernois
Navenne
Noidans-lès-Vesoul
Pusey
Pusy-et-Épenoux
Quincey
Vaivre-et-Montoille
Vesoul
Villeparois

References

Vesoul
Agglomeration communities in France
Intercommunalities of Haute-Saône